The Church of the Province of South East Asia is an autonomous member of the Anglican Communion, created in 1996 with the four dioceses of Kuching, Sabah, Singapore and West Malaysia.

There are approximately 98,000 Anglicans within the province, and the current Metropolitan Archbishop and Primate of the Province is Melter Tais, Bishop of Sabah.

History

Early Developments

Anglicanism was first introduced with the establishment of the British East India Company's settlement of Penang Island in 1786. George Caunter, a local magistrate, was appointed as a Lay Clerk/Acting Chaplain in 1799 under the jurisdiction of the See of Calcutta. In 1819, the first Anglican church building, the Church of St. George the Martyr, was consecrated by the Bishop of Calcutta, Thomas Fanshawe Middleton.

In 1826, the Mission Chapel of the London Missionary Society (LMS) started services in Singapore and the first church building in Singapore was built in 1837. In 1842, a missionary of the LMS started the first girls school in Singapore, now known as St. Margaret's School. The work in Borneo started in 1848 when a group of missionaries led by Francis Thomas McDougall was invited by James Brooke, the Rajah of Sarawak. In 1849, a wooden church was built in Kuching. In 1851, this church was consecrated by Daniel Wilson, Bishop of Calcutta in honour of St. Thomas the Apostle.

Establishment of Missionary Dioceses
Letters patent was issued in 1855 to establish the Bishopric of Labuan and McDougall was appointed the first Bishop of Labuan. McDougall was also appointed the Bishop of Sarawak by the Rajah of Sarawak due to the political conventions of the day ruled that no Anglican Diocese might be created outside the limits of the British Empire, and Sarawak was then technically an independent kingdom. This practice prevailed until the Sarawak became a Crown Colony in 1946.

In 1867, The East India Company transferred Penang to the British Crown and with that ended the chaplaincy of the Madras Presidency in Penang. The Anglican churches in Penang, Malacca and Singapore were organised into the Church in the Straits Settlement while remaining under the jurisdiction of the See of Calcutta.

The Church in the Straits Settlement was separated from the See of Calcutta by an Act of Parliament in 1869 and placed under the episcopal care of the Bishop of Labuan as the United Diocese of Singapore, Labuan and Sarawak. In 1909, the United Diocese was further divided into the Diocese of Singapore, the Diocese of Labuan and the Bishopric of Sarawak. The 3 separate Dioceses developed independently from then onwards until the creation of the Province.

Anglican work in Malaya and Singapore (1909–1996)
The period between the division of the United Diocese and the outbreak of the Second World War in the Pacific, missionary work continued with increasing ordination of local clergy and planting of churches all throughout the Malaya and Singapore.

During the duration of the Second World War, most expatriate clergy and missionaries were interned by the Japanese. Without the benefit of its expatriate clergy, the work of the church fell on the shoulders of local clergy and church workers.

This development highlighted the urgent need for training local leaders for this developing part of the Anglican Church and eventually led to the establishment of Singapore's Trinity Theological College in 1951.

Malaya gained her independence from British rule in 1957. Following this, in 1960, the Diocese was renamed the Diocese of Singapore and Malaya. In 1970, the churches in West Malaysia were separated from the Diocese and reconstituted as the Diocese of West Malaysia by an Act of Parliament and the Diocese was renamed the Diocese of Singapore.

Anglican work in British Borneo (1909–1996)
Work in British Borneo after the division of the United Diocese until the outbreak of the Second World War followed a similar pattern to the work in Malaya and Singapore. It was supported from 1909 by the Borneo Mission Association. Anglican missionaries were however more successful than their counterparts in Malaya and Singapore in evangelising the indigenous peoples.

Following the devastation of the Second World War, the Diocese of Labuan and the Bishopric of Sarawak was joined together as the Diocese of Borneo and the first Bishop, Nigel Cornwall, was consecrated in 1949. In 1962, the Diocese was again divided into the Diocese of Jesselton (later Diocese of Sabah) which included Labuan, and the Diocese of Kuching which included Brunei.

Province of South East Asia
In 1996, autocephaly was attained when the Province of South East Asia consisting of the Dioceses of West Malaysia, Singapore, Kuching and Sabah was established by the then-Archbishop of Canterbury, George Carey. Moses Tay, Bishop of Singapore, was installed as the first Metropolitan Archbishop of the Province the same year. The Province celebrated its 20th Anniversary in February 2016.

Membership
Today, there are at least 98,000 Anglicans out of an estimated population of 33.9 million.

Structure
The polity of the Church of the Province of South East Asia is Episcopalian church governance, which is the same as other Anglican churches. The church maintains a system of geographical parishes organised into dioceses. The Province is divided into four dioceses. Furthermore, the Dioceses of Kuching, West Malaysia and Singapore are further subdivided into archdeaconries and deaneries.
The Diocese of Kuching
The Diocese of Sabah
The Diocese of Singapore
The Diocese of West Malaysia

Current diocesan bishops
Melter Tais – Archbishop of South East Asia and Bishop of Sabah
Steven Abbarow – Bishop of West Malaysia
Danald Jute – Bishop of Kuching
Titus Chung – Bishop of Singapore

List of primates of South East Asia

Worship and liturgy
The Church of the Province of South East Asia embraces three orders of ministry: deacon, priest, and bishop. A local variant of the Book of Common Prayer is used.

Doctrine and practice

The center of the Church of the Province of South East Asia's teaching is the life and resurrection of Jesus Christ. The basic teachings of the church, or catechism, includes:
Jesus Christ is fully human and fully God. He died and was resurrected from the dead.
Jesus provides the way of eternal life for those who believe.
The Old and New Testaments of the Bible were written by people "under the inspiration of the Holy Spirit". The Apocrypha are additional books that are used in Christian worship, but not for the formation of doctrine.
The two great and necessary sacraments are Holy Baptism and Holy Eucharist
Other sacramental rites are confirmation, ordination, marriage, reconciliation of a penitent, and unction.
Belief in heaven, hell, and Jesus's return in glory.

The threefold sources of authority in Anglicanism are scripture, tradition, and reason. These three sources uphold and critique each other in a dynamic way. This balance of scripture, tradition and reason is traced to the work of Richard Hooker, a sixteenth-century apologist. In Hooker's model, scripture is the primary means of arriving at doctrine and things stated plainly in scripture are accepted as true. Issues that are ambiguous are determined by tradition, which is checked by reason.

Ecumenical relations
The dioceses of the Church of the Province of South East Asia participate in the ecumenical World Council of Churches via their respective national church councils:
Council of Churches of Malaysia
Diocese of Kuching and Brunei
Diocese of Sabah
Diocese of West Malaysia
National Council of Churches of Singapore
Diocese of Singapore

However, unlike many other Anglican churches, the Church of the Province of South East Asia is not a member of the World Council of Churches in its own right.

Anglican realignment
Together with the Church of the Province of Rwanda, the Church of the Province of South East Asia maintained a missionary organisation, the Anglican Mission in the Americas, in the United States and Canada, from 2000 to 2011. The Church of the Province of South East Asia has been active in the Anglican realignment, as member of the Global South and the Global Anglican Future Conference.

The province was represented at the GAFCON III, held on 17–22 June 2018, in Jerusalem, by a 18 members delegation, coming from Malaysia, Singapore and Cambodia.

See also
Christianity in Malaysia
Christianity in Singapore
Status of religious freedom in Malaysia

References

Further reading
 Neill, Stephen. Anglicanism. Harmondsworth, 1965.

External links
Diocese of West Malaysia – official website
Diocese of Singapore – official website
Diocese of Kuching – official website
Diocese of Sabah – official website
Historical documents on Anglicanism in Borneo/Sarawak
Society for the Propagation of the Gospel Archives on Borneo Mission – Centre for the Study of Christianity in Asia

 
Anglican denominations established in the 20th century
Anglican realignment denominations
Anglicanism in Asia
Anglicanism in Malaysia
Anglicanism in Singapore
Anglicanism in Thailand
Christianity in Brunei
Churches in Laos
Protestantism in Cambodia
Protestantism in Indonesia
Protestantism in Nepal
Protestantism in Vietnam
Religion in the British Empire
Christian organizations established in 1996